ACCESS Magazine that existed in print from 1992 and 2017 reports on research at the University of California Transportation Center and the University of California Center on Economic Competitiveness (UCCONNECT). The goal is to translate academic research into readable prose that is useful for policymakers and practitioners. Articles in ACCESS are intended to catapult academic research into debates about public policy, and convert knowledge into action. Authors of papers reporting on research here are solely responsible for their content.  Much of the research appearing in ACCESS was sponsored by the US Department of Transportation and the California Department of Transportation, neither of which is liable for its content or use.

History and profile
ACCESS was founded in 1992 by Melvin M. Webber, Professor of City and Regional Planning at the University of California, Berkeley, and has grown to become one of the most widely read publications of transportation research. In 2013, the magazine had over 8,500 subscribers. In Spring 2016, the magazine had printed 48 issues. Last print issue appeared in Spring 2017 and it became an online publication.

ACCESS is regularly referenced, reprinted, and translated in publications, including:  
Al Jazeera America 
American Institute of Architects, Los Angeles Chapter 
ASU News 
the Atlantic  
CityLab 
Austin Contrarian 
Be A Green Commuter 
BikeWalk Centerlines Newsletter 
Fortune 
GO Trans Explorer 
KTVU.com 
Horse Talk, New Zealand  
the Huffington Post  
the Huston Chronicle  
LA Streets Blog 
the Los Angeles Times 
the New York Times 
the Observer 
 PhysOrg 
 Planetizen  
Pollution Free Cities 
 Reconnecting America 
Safe Routes to School California 
Saporta Report 
 Sac Scribd 
The City Fix 
the Telegraph 
Toll Road News 
Transport Policy 
Transportation-Public Health Link 
 Transportation Research Board
 Transport Economics: Critical Concepts 
University of California, Davis Institute of Transportation Studies 
 UCLA Institute of the Environment and Sustainability 
UCLA Luskin School of Public Affairs  
UCLA Sustainability 
 UCLA Today 
 Urban Transport of China 
 U.S. News & World Report 
 the Washington Post 
 Wired 

The following Top 25 Planetizen ranked Urban Planning programs use ACCESS articles in their curricula: 
 University of California, Los Angeles
 Cornell University
 Rutgers University
 University of North Carolina at Chapel Hill
 Portland State University 
 Florida State University

The Editor is Donald Shoup, Professor of Urban Planning at UCLA.

The Managing Editor is John A. Mathews.

ACCESS is published twice a year during the fall and spring.

Awards
In 2013, ACCESS Magazine was named “Organization of the Year” at the 24th Annual California Transportation Funding (CTF) Transportation Awards. The CTF cited ACCESS as the “face of the University of California Transportation Center” and commended the Magazine for publishing “incisive commentary on transportation issues of the day.”

In 2014, ACCESS Magazine received the American Planning Association's (APA) 2014 National Planning Excellence Awards: Communications Initiative as well as APA California's 2014 Communications Initiative Award. Also in 2014, ACCESS Magazine was awarded the Certificate of Excellence from the Western Publishing Association, Finalist: “Initial Trade Print Categories: Semi-Annuals, Three-Time, and Quarterly.”

References

External links
 ACCESS Magazine website

1992 establishments in California
2017 disestablishments in California
Biannual magazines published in the United States
Defunct magazines published in the United States
Magazines established in 1990
Magazines disestablished in 2017
Magazines published in Los Angeles
Online magazines published in the United States
Online magazines with defunct print editions
Transport magazines published in the United States